Beckford is an English surname derived from Beckford, Worcestershire, or from a similar toponym. Notable people of this name include the following:

Allison Beckford (born 1979), Jamaican sprinter
Chris Beckford-Tseu (born 1984), Canadian professional ice hockey player
Darren Beckford (born 1967), English professional football player
Ethan Beckford (born 1999), Canadian soccer player
James Beckford (athlete) (born 1975), Jamaican long jump athlete in the 1996 Olympics
James A. Beckford
Jason Beckford (born 1970), English professional football player
Jermaine Beckford (born 1983), English professional football player
Lily Beckford (born 1997), English sprinter
Peter Beckford (colonial administrator), Jamaican planter and slave owner
Peter Beckford (junior), Jamaican planter, slave owner and politician
Peter Beckford, English fox hunter, author and Member of Parliament
Reginald Beckford (fl. 20th century), Panamanian sprinter and businessman
Richard Beckford (died 1796), English politician
Robert Beckford (contemporary), British academic, theologian, and filmmaker
Roxanne Beckford (born 1969), Jamaican actress
Tyson Beckford (born 1970), American supermodel and actor
William Beckford (1709–1770), English politician and slave owner; Lord Mayor of London
William Beckford of Somerley, Jamaican slave owner and writer
William Thomas Beckford (1760–1844), English novelist, art critic, travel writer, slave owner and politician

English toponymic surnames